The Indigenous Australian women's rugby league team (also known as the Indigenous Women's All Stars) is a rugby league football team that represents Aboriginal Australians and Torres Strait Islanders.  The team was first formed in late 2010 for their first match in February 2011.  The team currently plays in an annual All Stars Match against a National Rugby League Māori All Stars women's team.

Current squad
The following players were selected and played in the 11 February 2023 match against the Māori All Stars.
 

Note: * = Player's age estimated based on previous articles on various news and rugby league websites.

Results

See also

List of Indigenous All Stars players

References

External links

Indigenous All Stars (rugby league)
Indigenous Australian sport
Women's rugby league teams in Australia